For information on all University of Hawaiʻi at Mānoa sports, see Hawaii Rainbow Warriors

The Hawaiʻi Rainbow Warriors baseball team is a varsity intercollegiate athletic team of the University of Hawaiʻi at Mānoa in Honolulu, Hawaii, United States. The team is a member of the Big West Conference, which is part of the National Collegiate Athletic Association's Division I. Hawaii's first baseball team was fielded in 1923. The team plays its home games at Les Murakami Stadium in Honolulu, Hawaii. The Rainbow Warriors are coached by Rich Hill.

Year-by-year results

Hawaii in the NCAA Tournament

Major League Baseball
Hawaii has had 119 Major League Baseball Draft selections since the draft began in 1965.

See also
List of NCAA Division I baseball programs

References

External links
 

 
Baseball teams established in 1923
1923 establishments in Hawaii